Mireille Miller-Young is an associate professor of feminist studies at the University of California, Santa Barbara. Her research explores race, gender, and sexuality in visual culture and sex industries in the United States.
Miller-Young holds a PhD in American History from New York University.
She describes herself as an "academic pornographer", a term originally adopted by Sander Gilman.

Her current projects include a manuscript entitled Hoe Theory, contributions to The Black Erotic Archive, and contributions to The Sex Worker Oral History Project.

A Taste for Brown Sugar 

Miller-Young's 2004 PhD dissertation examines the history of black women in pornography with ethnographic methods. Called A Taste for Brown Sugar: The History of Black Women in American Pornography, the dissertation was hailed as "pioneering"
and was published as a book in 2014.
Reviewers have described the book as "masterful"
and lauded its "rigorous scholarship".
It has been described as "a remarkable text that applies critical race studies, feminist studies, sexuality studies, and film studies to Black women in pornography" and as a "must read" that is "deftly building" on the work of feminist scholars such as Angela Davis, Saidiya Hartman, and Celine Parrenas Shimizu. Upon its publication, the book was perceived as a foundational work that revisited ″the marginal histories of Black sex workers in pornographic industries but in connecting this to contemporary Black porn actors, Black feminist politics and the larger sphere of sexual politics.″

It won National Women's Studies Association and American Studies Association book awards in 2015.

Criminal case 
Miller-Young became known to a wider audience in 2014 when she assaulted a pair of teenage anti-abortion activists on campus, stealing and later destroying one of their signs. In her interview with police, Miller-Young said she felt "triggered" by the sign and had a "moral right" to remove the material from sight.
Miller-Young was charged with grand theft, battery, and vandalism. She pleaded no contest and was sentenced to 108 hours of community service and three years of probation. She was also ordered to pay restitution and attend anger management classes.

The case attracted widespread attention and precipitated think pieces from all over the political spectrum.
The UCSB Vice Chancellor for Student Affairs, Michael Young, published a letter on the incident that was interpreted as a rebuke to both sides involved in the altercation.
More than 30 professors from universities across the nation signed a letter of support for Miller-Young, describing her as a "gentle, brilliant mentor" who was a "victim of the cultural legacy of slavery"; she "fell victim to the graphic nature of the anti-abortion display [because] she [was] pregnant".
A column in the Los Angeles Times called Miller-Young a "sucker" who had walked into an obvious trap.

Academic Career 
Mireille Miller-Young is an associate professor of Feminist Studies and an Affiliate Faculty member in Film and Media Studies, Black Studies, History, and Comparative Literature at University of California, Santa Barbara. She was the Advancing Equity Through Research Fellow at the Hutchins Center for African and African American Research at Harvard University from 2019 to 2020 and a visiting Fellow at the ICI Berlin, the Institute for Cultural Inquiry in Berlin (Germany), from 2020 to 2021.

Publications

Books and book chapters

Articles

Awards 
 National Women's Studies Association Sarah A. Whaley book price, 2015
 American Studies Association John Hope Franklin Price, 2015
 Distinguished Teaching Award of the University of California, Santa Barbara, 2019

References

External links 
 
 Professional website of Mireille Miller-Young
 Mireille Miller-Young − UCSB faculty homepage

Feminist studies scholars
University of California, Santa Barbara faculty
Living people
Sex-positive feminists
Year of birth missing (living people)